Wild Swans is a ballet by Meryl Tankard with score by Soviet-born Australian composer Elena Kats-Chernin.

The story is based on The Wild Swans by Hans Christian Andersen and tells the tale of Eliza, a princess whose wicked-witch stepmother has changed Eliza's eleven brothers into swans. Eliza must knit magic shirts from stinging nettles in order to break the spell and transform her brothers back into human form. With its basis in a fairy tale, the ballet follows in the tradition of Tchaikovsky's The Nutcracker and Swan Lake, with ballet scores by Russian-born composers Prokofiev and Stravinsky also acknowledged influences.

The ballet was commissioned by the Australian Ballet and the Sydney Opera House. The score was completed in 2002 in collaboration with choreographer Meryl Tankard, who also worked with Kats-Chernin on part of the opening ceremony for the 2000 Sydney Olympics. It was given its premiere by the Australian Ballet at the Sydney Opera House on 29 April 2003.

Wild Swans Concert Suite
Kats-Chernin arranged a 12-movement concert suite from the ballet score. This was recorded by the Tasmanian Symphony Orchestra under Ola Rudner, with soprano Jane Sheldon, in 2004 and released on the ABC Classics label along with the composer's Piano Concerto and Mythic. The suite features prominent parts for soprano soloist; percussion, in particular the xylophone; and alto saxophone.

The suite was given its Australian concert premiere on 18 May 2008, by the SBS Radio and Television Youth Orchestra, with soprano Simone Easthope, under Matthew Krel, at the Verbrugghen Hall of the Sydney Conservatorium of Music.

Movements 
 Green Leaf (2:39)
 Eliza Aria (3:17)
 Brothers (1:50)
 Wicked Witch (1’51)
 Magic Spell Tango (3:42)
 Good Fairy (3:16)
 Knitting Nettles (3:17)
 Darkness in the Forest (3:43)
 Eliza and the Prince (3:55)
 Glow Worms (1:28)
 Mute Princess (3:50)
 Transformation (3:59)

Lloyds TSB advertisement 
The Eliza Aria recording featuring the Tasmanian Symphony Orchestra and Jane Sheldon was chosen for use in a series of television and cinema advertisements for British bank Lloyds TSB under the tagline "For the journey", launched in January 2007. The adverts were created by agency Rainey Kelly Campbell Roalfe Y&R, and feature animations by Studio AKA. They follow the fortunes of a couple who meet on a futuristic-looking train, called The Black Horse, after Lloyds' logo, through to their retirement. Following the initial minute-long advert, further 30-second instalments were aired, each advertising a different financial product. The touching animations combined with Kats-Chernin's music caught the public's imagination, and brought the music to attention in the United Kingdom and further afield.

Following the success of the advertisements, the recording of the suite was re-issued by ABC Classics with a new cover depicting a scene from the advert and from 2011 onwards has been used as the theme music for an ABC Radio National programme (Late Night Live), replacing another piece of hers (Russian Rag).

Derived works
The Eliza Aria was also used as the basis of "The Journey Continues", a dance music single and music video by DJ Mark Brown and singer Sarah Cracknell. The video is notable for its use of thousands of still photographs, played in sequence to produce a surreal effect, a form of stop motion animation with live subjects.

References

External links
Elena Kats-Chernin – Wild Swans, composer's notes
Kats-Chernin's Wild Swans ballet for Sydney, Boosey & Hawkes, April 2003
Kats-Chernin: Wild Swans takes flight in Sydney, Boosey & Hawkes, June 2003
Kats Chernin Wild Swans 4767639: Classical CD Reviews
Lloyds TSB – For the journey
Lloyds TSB for the journey advert on YouTube
RKCR Y&R
Studio AKA
The Journey Continues on YouTube

Ballets by Meryl Tankard
Ballets by Elena Kats-Chernin
2003 ballet premieres
Works based on The Wild Swans